Old Friends is an album by The Expos which was re-released on January 24, 2007 on Stomp.The Album was originally released by The Donuts, The Expos  under a different name. It has been remastered, with all of the problems the band had with the record fixed.

Track listing
 "Before Breakfast" - 4:48
 "On The Road" - 3:40
 "Little Red Hook" - 3:22
 "White Gunn" - 1:52
 "School Days" - 4:47
 "Old Friends" - 3:25
 "Dans La Rue Ou Vit Celle Que J'Aime" - 3:39
 "This Time Around" - 5:44
 "Black Gunn" - 1:52
 "To Be In Love, Under Rain" - 3:06
 "Brawl" - 3:26
 "A Flower For Tara" - 3:56

Personnel 
 Adam Marcinkowski - Trombone
 Reed Neagle - Drums, Vocals
 Adam Pariselli - Lead Guitar
 Christopher Shannon - Bass guitar
 Michel Verrier - Organ, Vocals, Guitar, Saxophone

External links
Old Friends at CD Universe

2007 albums
The Expos albums